Ahmed Said Musa Patel (16 January 1937 to 8 September 2009) was the first Imam (Muslim cleric) in New Zealand and served as the principal spiritual and religious advisor to the Islamic community from 1960 to 1986.

Resources 

Bishop, Martin C. '“A History of the Muslim Community in New Zealand to 1980”, thesis submitted in partial fulfilment of the requirement for the degree of M.A. in history at the University of Waikato' (Waikato University, 1997).
Drury, Abdullah, Islam in New Zealand: The First Mosque (Christchurch, 2007) 

1937 births
2009 deaths
New Zealand imams
Islam in New Zealand
20th-century imams
Religious leaders from Auckland
People from Surat
Indian emigrants to New Zealand